São Paulo FC is an association football club based in São Paulo, Brazil. Being one of the most successful and well-known clubs in the country, with a crowd of approximately 20 million fans, the club founded on 25 January 1930 has a series of records and achievements, some of them unique in all of Brazilian football.

Players

Appearances

Following is the list of the players with most appearances for São Paulo:

 Most appearances in Copa Libertadores: 90 – Rogério Ceni
 Most appearances in Campeonato Brasileiro Série A: 575 – Rogério Ceni
 Most appearances in Copa do Brasil: 67 – Rogério Ceni
 Most appearances in Campeonato Paulista: 343 – Waldir Peres
 Most appearances in 20th century: 617 – Waldir Peres
 Most appearances in 21st century: 906 – Rogério Ceni
 Most appearances has a captain: 978 – Rogério Ceni
 Most consecutive appearances: 132 – Rogério Ceni (23 January 2010 − 26 October 2011)
 Most appearances in a single season: 79 – Zetti, 1992
 Player with most major trophies: 18 – Rogério Ceni
 Youngest player: 16 years, 170 days – Leandro Alves, 27 March 2003, 1–1 vs. Al-Ittihad Tripoli
 Oldest player: 42 years, 276 days – Rogério Ceni, 28 October 2015, 1–3 vs. Santos
The first line-up: Nestor, Clodô, Barthô, Boock, Zito, Alves, Luisinho, Milton, Friedenreich, Seixas, Zuanella.

Goals scored

Following is the list of the players with most goals scored for São Paulo:

 Most goals scored in Copa Libertadores: 14 – Luis Fabiano, Rogério Ceni
 Most goals scored in Campeonato Brasileiro Série A: 108 – Luis Fabiano
 Most goals scored in Copa do Brasil: 24 – Luis Fabiano
 Most goals scored in Campeonato Paulista: 142 – Gino Orlando
 Most goals scored in 20th century: 242 – Serginho Chulapa
 Most goals scored in 21st century: 212 – Luis Fabiano
 Most goals scored in a single season: 49 – Waldemar de Brito, 1933
 Most goals scored in a single match: 6 – Antonio Sastre, 14 August 1943, 9–0 vs. Portuguesa Santista
 Most hat-tricks scored:  13 – França
 Best goals scored/matches ratio: 0.81 – Arthur Friedenreich, 102 goals scored in 124 matches
 First goal scored: Barthô – 23 March 1930, 6–1 vs. Juventus (SP)
 First goal scored at Estádio do Morumbi: Peixinho – 2 October 1960, 1–0 vs. Sporting CP
 Fastest goal scored: 10 seconds – Zé Roberto, 26 February 1969, 4–1 vs. São Bento
 Latest goal in regular time: 97th minute – Reinaldo, 27 July 2019, 2–1 vs. Fluminense
 Youngest goalscorer: 17 years, 13 days – Bindo, 10 June 1934, 4–2 vs. America (RJ)
 Oldest goalscorer: 42 years, 214 days – Rogério Ceni, 26 August 2015, 3–0 vs. Ceará
 Most goals scored by a goalkeeper: 131 – Rogério Ceni 
 Most goals scored by a defender: 78 – Roberto Dias
 Most goals scored by a midfielder: 128 – Raí 
 Most goals scored by a foreign player: 119 – Pedro Rocha

List of topscorers

Goalkeepers

The vast majority of records related to the goal of São Paulo are held by Rogério Ceni, but are some other great achievements made by other goalkeepers who played for the club.

Most clean sheets: 418 – Rogério Ceni
Most clean sheets in Campeonato Paulista: 153 – Waldir Peres
Most clean sheets in Campeonato Brasileiro: 184 – Rogério Ceni
Most clean sheets in Copa Libertadores: 40 – Rogério Ceni
Longest streak without conceding a goal (all matches):
9 matches (883 minutes): 10 May 1972 – 30 July 1972, goalkeeper Sérgio Valentim
Longest streak without conceding a goal in Campeonato Paulista matches:
10 matches (1017 minutes): 16 April 1972 – 6 August 1972, goalkeeper Sérgio Valentim
Longest streak without conceding a goal in Campeonato Brasileiro matches: 
9 matches (988 minutes): 5 August 2007 – 8 September 2007, goalkeeper Rogério Ceni
Longest streak without conceding a goal in Copa Libertadores matches: 
8 matches (808 minutes): 25 February 2010 – 28 July 2010, goalkeeper Rogério Ceni
Most defenses in penalty kick: 50 – Rogério Ceni
Most victories in penalty shoot-out: 12 – Rogério Ceni
Most assists: 7 – Rogério Ceni
Best average of goals conceded in more than 50 games: 0.66 – Toinho (86 goals suffered in 131 appearances)
Most goals conceded in a single match: 8 – King, 10 July 1940, 1–8 vs. Botafogo
Youngest goalkeeper: 17 years, 11 days – Naim, 1 May 1978, 2–0 vs. Usina Santa Elisa
Oldest goalkeeper: 42 years, 276 days – Rogério Ceni, 28 October 2015, 1–3 vs. Santos
 Goalkeepers who have scored a goal: 2 – Moscatto (1), Rogério Ceni (131)
Outfield players who played in goal:
Luisinho, 1 May 1931, 2–3 vs. Palestra Itália. Luisinho suffered 1 goal.
Cozinheiro, 20 June 1937, 3–1 vs. São Paulo Railway. Not suffered goals.
Rui, 16 April 1947, 1–5 vs. Corinthians. Rui suffered 4 goals.
Juliano Belletti, 10 May 2000, 1–2 vs. Santos. Not suffered goals.
Gustavo Nery, 24 July 2003, 1–2 vs. Ponte Preta. Nery suffered 1 goal.
Maicon Roque, 21 April 2016, 1–1 vs. The Strongest. Not suffered goals.

Disciplinary 

The main data for the disciplinary records of São Paulo:

Most yellow cards received: 97 – Rogério Ceni
Most red cards received: 16 – Serginho Chulapa, Luís Fabiano
Most cards (yellow+red) received: 111 – Luís Fabiano (95+16)
Never sent-off in more than 600 appearances: 617 – Waldir Peres
Never sent-off in more than 100 appearances in Campeonato Brasileiro: 180 – Hernanes
Never received a card in more than 200 appearances: 243 – Pablo Forlan

Foreign players

List of foreign players by country (in bold, currently in São Paulo) who were listed by the first team squad of the club:

 
 32:
Carlos Ponzinibbio (1934–1940)
Juan Castagno (1940)
Teofilo Juarez (1940)
Antonio Sastre (1943–1946)
Armando Renganeschi (1944–1948)
José Poy (1949–1962)
Elmo Bovio (1950)
Hector Gonzalez (1950–1951)
Gustavo Albella (1952–1954)
Eduardo Di Loreto (1952–1953)
Nicolás Moreno (1952–1953) 
Rinaldo Martino (1953)
Juan Negri (1953–1955)
Alfredo Runtzer (1954)
Gregório Beraza (1956–1957)
Luis Bonelli (1956–1957)
Pedro Prospitti (1966)
Horacio Ameli (2002)
Adrián González (2009–2010)
Marcelo Cañete (2011–2014)
Clemente Rodríguez (2013)
Ricardo Centurión (2015–2016) 
Andrés Chávez (2016–2017)
Julio Buffarini (2016–2017)
Lucas Pratto (2017)
Jonathan Gómez (2017–2020)
Martín Benítez (2021)
Emiliano Rigoni (2021–2022)
Jonathan Calleri (2016, 2021–)
Giuliano Galoppo (2022–)
Nahuel Bustos (2022)
Alan Franco (2023–)
 18:
Emilio Almiñana (1930–1931)
Aparizio Vega (1934–1935)
Daniel Gutiérrez (1936)
Graciano Acosta (1937–1938)
Herculano Squarza (1940–1942)
Vicente Ramón (1941–1942)
José Urruzmendi (1951)
Pablo Forlán (1970–1975)
Pedro Rocha (1970–1978)
Darío Pereyra (1977–1988)
Rubén Furtenbach (1985–1986)
Diego Aguirre (1990)
Juan Ramón Carrasco (1990)
Gustavo Matosas (1993)
Diego Lugano (2003–2006, 2016–2017)
Álvaro Pereira (2014)
Gonzalo Carneiro (2018–2021)
Gabriel Neves (2021–)
 7:
Roberto Rojas (1987–1989)
José Luis Sierra (1994–1995)
Manuel Neira (1995)
Gabriel Mendoza (1996)
Claudio Maldonado (2000–2003)
Nélson Saavedra (2009)
Eugenio Mena (2016)
 7:
Ruben Barrios (1944–1947)
Cecilio Martínez (1963–1965)
Carlos Safuán (1968–1969)
Néstor Isasi (1997–1999)
Celso Ayala (2000)
Iván Piris (2011–2012)
Antonio Galeano (2020–2021)
 6:
Víctor Aristizábal (1996–1998)
Dorlan Pabón (2014)
Wilder Guisao (2015–2016)
Santiago Tréllez (2018–2021)
Luis Manuel Orejuela (2021–)
Andrés Colorado (2022)
 5:
Héctor Carabalí (1999)
Néicer Reasco (2006–2008)
Joao Rojas (2018–2021)
Robert Arboleda (2017–)
Jhegson Méndez (2023–)
 4:
Laurentino Melo (1936)
Antonio Azambuja (1946–1949)
Antonio Fernandes (1966–1967)
João Moreira (2022–)
 2:
Fernando Carazzo (1936)
Juanfran (2020–2021)
 2:
Éder (2021–2022)
André Anderson (2022–)
 2:
Waldemar Zaclis (1938–1943)
Constantin de Maria (1951)
 2:
Alexander Rondón (2004)
Nahuel Ferraresi (2022–)
 1:
Abraham Ben-Lulu (1967)
 1:
František Šafránek (1964)
 1:
Juan Francisco Barraza (1964)
 1:
Josep Lengyl (1933–1934)
 1:
Musashi Mizushima (1985)
 1:
Christian Cueva (2016–2018)
 1:
Eugenio Chemp (1936–1941)

Juan Francisco Barraza and František Šafránek were ceded to São Paulo could complete its line-up in the matches against Alianza and Dukla Praha, in 1964
Manuel Neira and Nélson Saavedra never entered the field
Éder and André Anderson are born in Brazil, but by FIFA rules are eligible for Italy, thus considering Italian players

Internationals

Most international caps as a São Paulo player: 48 – Oscar (27 August 1980 – 7 May 1986)
Most international goals as a São Paulo player: 16 – Careca (28 April 1983 – 21 June 1986)
Golden medalist at the Summer Olympics: 1 – Rodrigo Caio (2016)
 Players who have been called up from the FIFA World Cup while playing for São Paulo: 53 –  46,  4,  1,  1,  1
 Players who have won the FIFA World Cup while playing for São Paulo: 13 – (in the below table, the players in bold)

Awards
Intercontinental Cup "Man of The Match": Raí (1992), Toninho Cerezo (1993)
Toyota Award (Copa Libertadores best player): Amoroso (2005)
Adidas Golden Ball (FIFA Club World Cup best player): Rogério Ceni (2005)

Ballon d'Or

Player who have made his professional debut for São Paulo and have won the Ballon d'Or: Kaká – 2007, playing for AC Milan
Player who have played for São Paulo after won the Ballon d'Or: Rivaldo – 2011 (has won the 1999 Ballon d'Or playing for FC Barcelona)

Kaká also returned to São Paulo on the 2014 season.

Guinness World records

In 2014, Rogério Ceni received certification for three records established at the end of the 2013 season: most matches for the same team (1117), goalkeeper with most goals scored (113) and player who most times captained a club (886) . At the end of his career in 2015, the final numbers are as follows:

Association football goalkeeper who have scored more goals in the history: Rogério Ceni – 131 goals
Association football player who have more appearances for one club: Rogério Ceni – 1237 matches
Association football player who have more matches as captain for one club: Rogério Ceni – 978 matches

The records remain unbeatable until the present moment.

Other record

On 16 November 1994, Juninho Paulista played two games for São Paulo. The first was during the first leg of the Copa CONMEBOL quarter-finals against Sporting Cristal from Peru (3–1 win) with São Paulo using their reserve team. In the second, he come on as a second-half substitute against Grêmio in the Campeoanto Brasileiro (also with a 3–1 win).

Bola de Prata

The Bola de Prata is the most traditional award in Brazilian football, which has chosen the "Best XI" in the editions of the Campeonato Brasileiro, since 1971:

Bola de Prata (best XI) award winners playing for São Paulo: 58
Bola de Ouro (best player) award winners playing for São Paulo: 5 – Waldir Peres (1975), Careca (1986), Ricardo Rocha (1989), Kaká (2002), Rogério Ceni (2008)

Rogério Ceni was also awarded with a special honor ("Conjunto da Obra") in 2015, when he announced his retirement.

Prêmio Craque do Brasileirão

Craque do Brasileirão (best player) award winners playing for São Paulo: 3 – Rogério Ceni (2006, 2007), Hernanes (2008)
Craque da Galera (supporters choice) award winners playing for São Paulo: 3 – Rogério Ceni (2007, 2014), Hernanes (2017)
Revelação do Campeonato (best young player) award winners playing for São Paulo: 1 – Breno (2007)

Prêmio Melhores do Paulistão

Craque do Paulistão (Campeonato Paulista best player): 1 – Martín Benítez (2021)

Managerial records

Following is the list of the main managerial records of São Paulo:

Most matches

First manager: Rubens Salles (1930–1934)
Most official titles won: 10 – Telê Santana
Most matches won: 310 – Vicente Feola
Most consecutive years as manager: 5 years and 71 days – Telê Santana (10 October 1990 – 30 January 1996)
Most consecutive matches as manager: 244 – José Poy (1973–1976)
Best win/matches ratio with at least 60 matches: 0.75 – Clodô, 52 wins in 74 matches
 Youngest manager: 25 years, 56 days – Cosme Geraldino, 7 September 1972, 4–0 vs. Cascavel EC
 Oldest manager: 64 years, 186 days – Telê Santana, 27 January 1996, 1–1 vs. Rio Branco
Most matches as a caretaker: 30 – Milton Cruz

Awards

Prêmio Craque do Brasileirão

Best manager of Campeonato Brasileiro: 3 – Muricy Ramalho (2006, 2007, 2008)

Prêmio Melhores do Paulistão

Best manager of Campeonato Paulista: 2 – Hernán Crespo (2021), Rogério Ceni (2022)

Achievements

Champions as a player and manager for São Paulo:
José Poy
Player: 3 – 1949 Campeonato Paulista, 1953 Campeonato Paulista, 1957 Campeonato Paulista 
Manager: 1 – 1975 Campeonato Paulista 
Muricy Ramalho
Player: 2 – 1975 Campeonato Paulista, 1977 Campeonato Brasileiro Série A
Manager: 5 – 1994 Copa CONMEBOL, 1996 Copa Master de CONMEBOL, 2006 Campeonato Brasileiro Série A, 2007 Campeonato Brasileiro Série A, 2008 Campeonato Brasileiro Série A
Nelsinho Baptista
Player: 1 – 1975 Campeonato Paulista
Manager: 1 – 1998 Campeonato Paulista

Honours

The club has a total of 42 official titles, in addition to other historic achievements. Following are the main titles won by São Paulo:

Major competitions

Worldwide

Intercontinental Cup:
 Winners (2): 1992, 1993
FIFA Club World Cup:
 Winners: 2005
Suruga Bank Championship:
 Runners-up: 2013

Continental

Copa Libertadores:
 Winners (3): 1992, 1993, 2005
 Runners-up (3): 1974, 1994, 2006
Supercopa Libertadores:
 Winners: 1993
 Runners-up: 1997
Recopa Sudamericana:
 Winners (2): 1993, 1994
 Runners-up (2): 2006, 2013
 Copa CONMEBOL:
 Winners: 1994
 Copa Master de CONMEBOL:
 Winners: 1996
 Copa Sudamericana:
 Winners: 2012
 Runners-up: 2022
 Copa de Oro:
 Runners-up (2): 1995, 1996

National

Campeonato Brasileiro Série A:
 Winners (6): 1977, 1986, 1991, 2006, 2007, 2008
 Runners-up (6): 1971, 1973, 1981, 1989, 1990, 2014
Copa do Brasil:
 Runners-up: 2000
Copa dos Campeões:
 Runners-up: 2001
Copa dos Campeões da Copa Brasil:
 Runners-up: 1978

Regional

Campeonato Paulista:
 Winners (22): 1931, 1943, 1945, 1946, 1948, 1949, 1953, 1957, 1970, 1971, 1975, 1980, 1981, 1985, 1987, 1989, 1991, 1992, 1998, 2000, 2005, 2021
 Runners-up (25): 1930, 1932, 1933, 1934, 1938, 1941, 1944, 1950, 1952, 1956, 1958, 1962, 1963, 1967, 1972, 1978, 1982, 1983, 1994, 1996, 1997, 2003, 2006, 2019, 2022
Supercampeonato Paulista:
 Winners: 2002
Torneio Rio-São Paulo:
 Winners: 2001
 Runners-up (4): 1933, 1962, 1998, 2002

Other competitions

InternationalTaça Ministro das Relações Exteriores (1): 1941Taça Coletividade Brasileira (1): 1945Taça Malmö FF (1): 1949Trofeo Jarrito (1): 1955
 Small Club World Cup (2): 1955, 1963I Copa São Paulo – Torneio Internacional do Morumbi (1): 1957Torneo Quadrangular de Cali (1): 1960Torneo Pentagonal de Guadalajara (1): 1960Taça Sporting CP (1): 1960Taça Deputado Mendonça Falcão (1): 1960Taça Club Nacional (1): 1963I Triangular de El Salvador (1): 1964Coppa Città di Firenzi (1): 1964Troféu Sport Lisboa e Benfica (1): 1968Trofeo Colombino (1): 1969Troféu Seleções do Reader's Digest (1): 1970Troféu José Alves Marques (1): 1971Trofeo Cyro Ciambruno (1): 1974Trofeo Federación Mexicana de Fútbol (1): 1981Troféu Nabi Abi Chedid (1): 1981Sunshine International Series (1): 1982Jamaica Cup (1): 1987Trinidad & Tobago Cup (1): 1987Torneo Hexagonal de Guadalajara (1): 1989Stora 100 years Trophy (1): 1988Super Soccer Cup – India (2): 1989, 2007KKT Gahara Cup (1): 1989Copa Amistad Brazil–Chile (1): 1990Copa Solidariedad de León (1): 1990Ciutat de Barcelona Trophy (2): 1991, 1992Ramón de Carranza Trophy (1): 1992Teresa Herrera Trophy (1): 1992Torneo Ciudad de Santiago (1): 1993Trofeo Santiago de Compostela (1): 1993Los Angeles Soccer Cup (2): 1993, 1999Trofeo Jalisco (1): 1993Trofeo San Lorenzo de Almagro (1): 1994Trofeo Bortolotti (1): 1995Copa Cerveza Cristal (1): 1996 Torneo de Club Hermanos (1): 1997Torneo Pachuca Cuña de Mexico (1): 1999Euro-America Cup (1): 1999Constantino Cury Tournament (1): 2000Eusébio Cup (1): 2013
 Florida Cup (1): 2017

NationalTaça Governador Regis Pacheco (1): 1954Torneio Triangular de Uberaba (1): 1954Torneio Nunes Freire (1): 1976 II Copa São Paulo (1): 1976Torneio Triangular de Maringá (1): 1976Torneio Triangular Luiz Henrique Rosas (1): 1985Taça Oscar Bernardi (1): 1985Taça Centro Esportivo de Ceres (1): 1986Torneio Quadrangular Governador José Moraes (1): 1986 Torneio Rei Dadá (1): 1995Copa dos Campeões Mundiais (2): 1995, 1996

Regional

 Taça dos Campeões Estaduais Rio – São Paulo (11): 1931, 1943, 1945, 1946, 1948, 1954, 1958, 1975, 1980, 1985, 1987
 Torneio Inicio Paulista (3): 1932, 1940, 1945
 Torneio dos Cinco Clubes (1): 1934
 Taça Cidade de São Paulo (1): 1944
 Torneio Pentagonal R. Monteiro (1): 1949
 Torneio Prefeito Lineu Prestes (1): 1950
 Torneio Quadrangular Paulista (1): 1952
 Taça Armando Arruda Pereira (1): 1952
 Torneio Roberto Gomes Pedrosa (1): 1956
 Taça Charles Miller (1): 1956
 Taça Piratininga (4): 1967, 1969, 1970, 1971
 Torneio Triangular Piracicabano (1): 1976

Reserve team

From 1904 to 1998, during some seasons, the Campeonato Paulista de Aspirantes (also called Campeonato Paulista de Segundos Quadros) was played simultaneously with the Campeonato Paulista main level. The competition was prepared at reserve teams dispute and newly promoted players from the youth sectors. The following editions were conquered by São Paulo:

 Campeonato Paulista de Aspirantes (18): 1933 (APEA), 1938, 1940, 1942, 1943, 1944, 1945, 1946, 1947, 1953, 1954, 1955, 1958 (Extra), 1960, 1962, 1976, 1993, 1995
 Torneio Eduardo José Farah (1): 1988
 Copa João Jorge Saad (1): 1997

Youth sectors

U–23

 Campeonato Brasileiro Sub-23 (1): 2018

U–20

 Campeonato Paulista Sub-20 (9): 1954, 1955, 1956, 1987, 1995, 1999, 2000, 2011, 2016 
 Taça Belo Horizonte de Juniores  (2): 1987, 1997
 Copa São Paulo de Futebol Júnior (4): 1993, 2000, 2010, 2019 
 Blue Stars/FIFA Youth Cup (2): 1999, 2000
 Copa Brasil 500 anos (1): 1999
 Copa Intercontinental Centenário Sub-20 (1): 2000
 Copa do Brasil Sub-20 (3): 2015, 2016, 2018
 Copa Ouro Sub-20 (3): 2015, 2016, 2017
 Copa RS Sub-20 (3): 2015, 2016, 2017
 U-20 Copa Libertadores (1): 2016
 Supercopa do Brasil Sub-20 (1): 2018

U–19

 Campeonato Paulista Juvenil Sub-19 (1): 1964
 Dallas Cup (3): 1995, 2007, 2009

U–18

 Campeonato Paulista Juvenil Sub-18 (8): 1942, 1946, 1954, 1969, 1970, 1973, 1976, 1979
 Aspire Tri-Series Sub-18 (1): 2017
 Future Cup Sub-18 (1): 2017

U–17

 Campeonato Paulista Sub-17 (8): 1963, 1982, 1991, 1995, 2006, 2015, 2016, 2019
 Mundial de Clubes de La Comunidad de Madrid Sub-17 (2): 2007, 2008
 Desafio Pelé de Futebol Internacional Sub-17 (1): 2007
 Copa do Brasil Sub-17 (2): 2013, 2020
 Taça Belo Horizonte de Juniores (2): 2016, 2017
 Copa Ouro Sub-17 (2): 2016, 2017
 J-League Challenge Cup Sub-17 (1): 2018
 FAM Cup Sub-17 (2): 2018, 2019
 Supercopa do Brasil Sub-17 (1): 2020

U–16

 Campeonato Paulista Infantil / Juvenil C (3): 1954, 1977, 1978
 Salvador Cup (2): 2016, 2017

U–15

 Campeonato Paulista Sub-15 (10): 1984, 1989, 1992, 1995, 1997, 1999, 2007, 2008, 2014, 2018
 Copa Votorantim Sub-15 (5): 1991, 1992, 2013, 2014, 2016
 Copa Nike Sub-15 (5): 1998, 2002, 2006, 2007, 2009
 Manchester United Premier Cup (2): 2002, 2009
 Copa do Brasil Sub-15 (1): 2008
 Copa 2 de Julho (1): 2011

U–14

 Campeonato Paulista Infantil Sub-14 (3): 1973, 1975, 1976

U–13

 Gothia Cup (1): 2013
 Campeonato Paulista Sub-13 (1): 2019

U–11

 Campeonato Paulista Sub-11 (1): 2018

Women

 Participations 

 Campeonato Paulista record 

São Paulo disputed the Campeonato Paulista for 93 seasons, (92 regular editions, and the 2002 Supercampeonato Paulista). Do not competed in the 1935 edition when, due to financial problems, had to negotiate the club stadium (Chácara da Floresta) with the Clube de Regatas Tietê.

 Torneio Rio-São Paulo record 

São Paulo disputed the Torneio Rio-São Paulo for 25 seasons. The 1934 edition only had the state stages, and the 1940 edition was not officially finalized. São Paulo did not only participate in the 1993 edition.

 Torneio Roberto Gomes Pedrosa record 

São Paulo disputed the Torneio Roberto Gomes Pedrosa for all the 4 seasons. On 22 December 2010, those editions are officially recognized by CBF as part of the Campeonato Brasileiro.

 Campeonato Brasileiro Série A record 

São Paulo disputed the Campeonato Brasileiro for 51 seasons (55, plus the 4 of Torneio Roberto Pedrosa). Since 2003 the Campeonato Brasileiro were disputed in a double round-robin system, and starting from 2006, with 20 clubs per edition.

 Copa do Brasil record 
São Paulo disputed the Copa do Brasil for 22 seasons. From 2001 to 2014, Brazilian clubs that competed in the Copa Libertadores did not participate in the Copa do Brasil due to lack of dates.

 Copa Libertadores record 
São Paulo disputed the Copa Libertadores for 21 seasons.

 Supercopa Libertadores record 
São Paulo disputed the Supercopa Libertadores for 6 seasons.

 Copa Mercosur record 

São Paulo disputed all the 4 editions of the Copa Mercosur, but never advanced from the group stage.

 Copa Sudamericana record 
São Paulo disputed the Copa Sudamericana for 13 seasons. From 2007 to 2009, qualified as the Campeonato Brasileiro champions, in 2013 as the Copa Sudamericana champions holder, in 2014 as one of the lucky losers of the Copa do Brasil, and in 2020, being 3rd in Group D of the Copa Libertadores. In the other editions, São Paulo qualified for being in the best intermediate positions of the Campeonato Brasileiro that did not qualify for the Copa Libertadores.

Team records

Achievements

Brazilian club with most world championships: 3 – 1992, 1993, 2005
Brazilian club with most international level official championships: 12 trophiesThe "CONMEBOL Treble": 1993 Copa Libertadores, 1993 Supercopa Libertadores and 1993 Recopa Sudamericana
The "Quad Crown": 1993 Copa Libertadores, 1993 Supercopa Libertadores, 1993 Recopa Sudamericana and 1993 Intercontinental Cup
The "Triple Crown": 1992: 1992 Copa Libertadores, 1992 Intercontinental Cup, 1992 Campeonato Paulista2005: 2005 Campeonato Paulista, 2005 Copa Libertadores, 2005 FIFA Club World Cup
The "Campeonato Brasileiro Three-peat":
2006, 2007, 2008
All-time Campeonato Brasileiro table (1959–2021): 1st placeRanking Placar (1971–2010): 1st placeOne of the three remain unrelegated clubs in Brazil (besides Flamengo and Santos)

Awards

Troféu do DEIP "O Clube Mais Querido da Cidade" : 1 – 1940
Taça "O Esporte" – São Paulo 12–1 Jabaquara: 1 – 1945
Taça dos Invictos: 6 – 1946, 1947, 1972, 1975, 2005, 2007
Taça Newton Sá e Silva: 1 – 1950
Trofeo La Nazione: 1 – 1964
Troféu Esporte Moura: 1 – 1964
Taça Independência do Brasil: 1 – 1971
Taça Governador do Estado de São Paulo: 3 – 1980, 2006, 2007
Troféu Semana da Asa – Embraer: 1 – 1986
Troféu Clube dos 13 : 1 – 1991
Troféu Palácio dos Bandeirantes: 4 – 1991, 1992, 1998, 2000
Taça Prefeitura de São Paulo: 1 – 1992
Toyota Cup: 2 – 1992, 1993
Japan Airlines Cup: 2 – 1993, 1994
Trofeo Xacobeo: 1 – 1993
Troféu Futel: 1 – 1995
Taça Phillips do Brasil: 1 – 1999
Taça TV Globo – 40 Anos: 1 – 2005
Troféu Osmar Santos: 4 – 2006, 2007, 2018, 2020
Troféu João Saldanha: 4 – 2006, 2007, 2008, 2012
Taça Grupo de Empresários de São Paulo – GESP: 2 – 2006, 2007
Taça Federação Brasiliense de Futebol: 1 – 2008
Prêmio CONAFUT: 1 – 2021

Season records

Following are the main season records of São Paulo:

Most matches played: 100 matches (44 wins, 32 draws, 24 loses) – 1978
Fewest matches played: 5 matches (3 wins, 2 draws, 0 loses) – 1935
Most matches won: 50 wins in 83 matches – 1982
Most matches drawn: 38 draws in 80 matches – 1986
Most matches defeats: 36 loses in 89 matches – 2016
Most matches won in Campeonato Paulista: 28 wins – 1981
Most matches won in Campeonato Brasileiro: 24 wins – 2007
Most matches won in Copa Libertadores: 9 wins – 2005
Fewest matches defeats: 0 loses – 1935
Fewest matches defeats in Campeonato Paulista: 0 loses – 1946
Fewest matches defeats in Campeonato Brasileiro: 2 loses – 2007
Fewest matches defeats in Copa Libertadores: 1 lose – 2005
Most goals scored: 203 goals – 1956
Most goals conceded: 119 goals – 1994
Most goals scored in Campeonato Paulista: 116 goals – 1956
Most goals scored in Campeonato Brasileiro: 81 goals – 2003
Most goals scored in Copa Libertadores: 34 goals – 2005
Fewest goals conceded: 7 goals – 1935
Fewest goals conceded in Campeonato Paulista: 7 goals – 1972
Fewest goals conceded in Campeonato Brasileiro: 12 goals – 1981
Fewest goals conceded in Copa Libertadores: 2 goals – 2019
Best goals difference: 97 goals – 1956
Best goals difference in Campeonato Paulista: 65 goals – 1956
Best goals difference in Campeonato Brasileiro: 40 goals – 1986
Best goals difference in Copa Libertadores: 20 goals – 2005

Streaks

Following are all the main streak sequences reached by São Paulo:

Longest unbeaten run :47 matches: 13 November 1974 – 3 August 1975
Longest unbeaten run at Estádio do Morumbi:31 matches: 20 July 1986 – 22 April 1987
Longest unbeaten run at Estádio do Pacaembu:26 matches: 8 May 1943 – 1 April 1944
Longest unbeaten run as home team and at Chácara da Floresta:35 matches: 16 March 1930 – 6 April 1932
Longest unbeaten run as away team:24 matches: 3 November 1974 – 30 July 1975
Longest unbeaten run in Campeonato Paulista:39 matches: 13 November 1974 – 3 August 1975
Longest unbeaten run in Campeonato Brasileiro:18 matches: 20 August 2008 – 7 December 2008
Longest unbeaten run in Copa Libertadores:11 matches: 30 March 1974 – 11 September 1974
Longest unbeaten run in Copa Libertadores at the Estádio do Morumbi:30 matches: 4 June 1987 – 8 March 2006
Longest winning streak:11 victories, 3 times (18 July 1943 – 19 September 1943), (28 October 1982 – 5 December 1982), (1 March 2012 – 12 April 2012)
Longest winning  streak at Estádio do Morumbi:12 victories: 12 March 2015 – 6 June 2015
Longest winning streak at Estádio do Pacaembu:17 victories: 16 August 1953 – 13 June 1954
Longest winning streak as home team and at Chácara da Floresta:17 victories: 21 May 1933 – 7 April 1934
Longest winning streak in Campeonato Paulista:14 victories: 9 August 1953 – 15 November 1953 
Longest winning streak in Campeonato Brasileiro:10 victories: 5 October 2002 – 17 November 2002
Longest scoring run:104 matches: 23 March 1930 – 29 October 1933
Longest scoring run as home team:83 matches: 30 March 1930 – 25 January 1936
Longest scoring run at Chácara da Floresta:81 matches: 30 March 1930 – 17 March 1935
Longest scoring run at Estádio do Morumbi:39 matches: 19 September 1965 – 22 May 1968
Longest scoring run as away team:43 matches: 23 March 1930 – 29 October 1933
Longest scoring run in Campeonato Paulista:74 matches: 23 March 1930 – 22 October 1933
Longest scoring run in Campeonato Brasileiro:38 matches: 22 September 2002 – 27 July 2003
Longest scoring run in Copa Libertadores:23 matches: 16 June 2004 – 3 May 2006
Longest streak without conceding a goal:7 matches: 23 January 1983  – 27 February 1983
Longest streak without conceding a goal as home team:8 matches: 12 March 2015  – 6 May 2015
Longest streak without conceding a goal as away team:8 matches: 19 January 1975  – 16 April 1975
Longest streak without conceding a goal in Campeonato Paulsista:7 matches: 26 July 1984 – 25 August 1984
Longest streak without conceding a goal in Campeonato Brasileiro:9 matches: 5 August 2007  – 8 September 2007
Longest streak without conceding a goal in Copa Libertadores:8 matches: 14 April 1992  – 5 May 1993

Record wins

Overall and Campeonato Paulista: 
São Paulo 12–1 Sírio – 27 August 1933, Chácara da Floresta
São Paulo 12–1 Jabaquara – 8 July 1945, Estádio do Pacaembu
São Paulo 11–0 SC Internacional – 3 July 1932, Chácara da Floresta
Copa do Brasil:
São Paulo 10–0 Botafogo (PB) – 28 March 2001, Estádio do Morumbi
Campeonato Brasileiro:
São Paulo 7–0 Paysandu – 28 September 2004, Estádio do Morumbi
Copa Libertadores:
São Paulo 6–0 Trujillanos – 5 April 2016, Estádio do Morumbi
Final match:
São Paulo 6–1 Peñarol – 14 December 1994, Estádio do Morumbi, 1994 Copa CONMEBOL Finals first leg
As the away team:
Operário de Ourinhos 0–10 São Paulo – 14 November 1943, Ourinhos
Against a foreign team:
São Paulo 8–0 Mitsubishi – 1 February 1970, Estádio do Morumbi
Against a European team:
São Paulo 6–0 Malmö FF – 4 December 1949, Estádio do Pacaembu
Against a national team:
São Paulo 6–2  – 17 February 1962, Estádio do Pacaembu
São Paulo 5–1  – 22 September 1981, Estádio do Morumbi
 0–4 São Paulo – 8 January 1989, Jawaharlal Nehru Stadium, New Delhi, India

Record defeats

Overall: 
Botafogo 8–1 São Paulo – 10 July 1940, Estádio das Laranjeiras, Torneio Rio-São Paulo
Campeonato Paulista:
São Paulo 0–5 Portuguesa – 2 April 1939, Estádio Antarctica Paulista
Corinthians 5–0 São Paulo – 10 March 1996, Estádio Santa Cruz
Campeonato Brasileiro:
Vasco da Gama 7–1 São Paulo – 25 November 2001, Estádio São Januário
At Estádio do Morumbi:
São Paulo 1–5 Internacional – 20 January 2021, 2020 Campeonato Brasileiro Série A
Against a foreign team:
Peñarol 5–0 São Paulo – 24 December 1944, Centenario, Montevideo, Uruguay
Against a national team:
 4–1 São Paulo – 12 August 1969, Stadion Balgarska Armia, Sofia, Bulgaria

Matches

First match: São Paulo 3–0 Ypiranga, 9 March 1930, Chácara da Floresta, Torneio Inicio Paulista
First competitive and Campeonato Paulista match: São Paulo 0–0 Ypiranga, 16 March 1930, Chácara da Floresta, 1930 Campeonato Paulista
First match against a national team: São Paulo 5–3 , 10 August 1930, Chácara da Floresta, Friendly
First match against a foreign and South American club: São Paulo 2–1 River Plate, 14 February 1935, Chácara da Floresta, Friendly
Last match at Chácara da Floresta: São Paulo 1–1 São Cristóvão, 17 March 1935, Friendly
First match at Estádio do Pacaembu: São Paulo 5–6 America (RJ), 11 May 1940, Friendly
First match played outside Brazil: Nacional 3–1 São Paulo, 20 December 1944, Centenario, Montevideo, Uruguay
First match against a European club: São Paulo 4–2 Southampton, 25 May 1948, Pacaembu, Friendly
First match played outside South America and first match played in Europe: Belenenses 2–4 São Paulo, 6 May 1951, Campo das Salésias, Lisbon, Portugal
First match played in Central and North America: América 0–0 São Paulo, 29 May 1955, Estadio Ciudad de los Deportes, Mexico City, Mexico
First match at Estádio do Morumbi: São Paulo 1–0 Sporting CP, 2 October 1960, Friendly
First Torneio Roberto Gomes Pedrosa match: Bangu 2–1 São Paulo, 12 March 1967, Maracanã, 1967 Torneio Roberto Gomes Pedrosa
First match played against an African club: Wydad Casablanca 0–3 São Paulo, 31 August 1969, Stade Mohammed V, Casablanca, Morocco
First Campeonato Brasileiro match: São Paulo 0–3 Grêmio, 7 August 1971, Morumbi, 1971 Campeonato Brasileiro Série A
First Copa Libertadores match: Atlético Mineiro 2–2 São Paulo, 25 January 1972, Mineirão, 1972 Copa Libertadores
First match played in Asia:  1–1 São Paulo, 13 December 1979, Prince Faisal bin Fahd Stadium, Riyadh, Saudi Arabia
First Copa Sudamericana match: Grêmio 0–4 São Paulo, 30 July 2003, Estádio Olímpico Monumental, 2003 Copa Sudamericana

Canceled matches

Albion 1–0 São Paulo – 24 May 1936, 1936 Campeonato Paulista: Albion withdrew from the league and all matches involving the club were canceled
Ponte Preta 1–0 São Paulo – 16 July 2005, 2005 Campeonato Brasileiro Série A, due to 2005 Brazilian football match-fixing scandal
São Paulo 3–2 Corinthians – 7 September 2005, 2005 Campeonato Brasileiro Série A, due to 2005 Brazilian football match-fixing scandal

Attendances

The biggest attendances of the club were obtained before the reformulations of Estádio do Morumbi occurred over the years, which today currently holds 66,795 spectators. Changes in Brazilian legislation and safety standards also make it impossible for the stadium's maximum capacity to be reached in games with the away team's fans. Following is the list:

Biggest attendance: 122,209 – São Paulo 1–0 Santos, 16 November 1980, 1980 Campeonato Paulista Finals
Biggest attendance in Campeonato Brasileiro: 103,092 – São Paulo 3–0 Operário (MS), 26 February 1978, 1977 Campeonato Brasileiro Série A
Biggest attendance in Copa Libertadores: 105,185 – São Paulo 1–0 Newell's Old Boys, 17 June 1992, 1992 Copa Libertadores Finals
Best total attendance (season): 1,194,361 – 43 matches, 1980
Best attendance average (season): 29,566 – 2018
Best attendance average in Campeonato Paulista: 33,630 – 2022
Best attendance average in Campeonato Brasileiro: 41,179 – 1981
Best attendance average in Copa Libertadores: 68,725''' – 1993

Transfers

Highest transfer fees paid

Highest transfer fees received

Head-to-head record

Record against Brazilian clubs with at least 20 matches played:

Record against American clubs (at least 10 matches):

Record against European clubs (at least 3 matches):

Record against national teams:

Notes

References

São Paulo FC
Brazilian football club statistics